Edmundo is a common name that is used by many individuals including:

 Edmundo Alves de Souza Neto, former Brazilian football player
 Edmundo Farolan, Filipino writer
 Edmundo Ros, Trinidadian musician
 Edmundo Rivero, Argentine singer
 Edmundo Jarquín, Nicaraguan politician
 Edmundo Pisano (1919–1997), Chilean botanist and geographer
 Edmundo O'Gorman, Irish-Mexican writer and historian
 Edmundo Zura, Ecuadoran football player

Spanish masculine given names
Portuguese masculine given names

es:Edmundo Alves de Souza Neto
pt:Edmundo